Alicia Killaly (also called Alice Killaly, 1836–1908) was a Canadian watercolour painter. She was born in London, Ontario in 1836. She lived in Quebec City, Montreal and Toronto during the 1840s and 1850s. Killaly married Christopher H. Turner, a former British soldier, in 1871 and moved to England. Killaly died in 1908 in Grantham, Lincolnshire.

A watercolour from the sketchbook of an unknown artist in the collection of the Toronto Public Library is titled Camping Out No. 2: Alice Killaly Sketching in a Canoe, Sparrow Lake, Ontario. May 1867. It shows the subject alone in a canoe in a lake, mostly hidden under a large umbrella.

Her work depicts outdoor scenes in Canada, such as canoe trips, frozen rivers and Niagara Falls, and she may have been a student of Cornelius Krieghoff. Her watercolour, Quebec From Across the St. Lawrence, from about 1867, is in the collection of the Royal Ontario Museum. An 1868 series of chromolithographs, A Picnic at Montmorency, on the subject of a humorous winter picnic is her only known commercial venture. Copies of these lithographs are held at the National Gallery of Canada, McCord Museum of Canadian History and the Royal Ontario Museum, where they were part of the 2013 exhibit, Brushing It in the Rough: Women, Art and Nineteenth Century Canada. in 1871 she married C. H. Turner.  She is not known to have produced any artworks after her marriage.

Gallery

Notes

References

Alicia Killaly, art auction details, blouinartinfo

1836 births
1908 deaths
19th-century Canadian painters
19th-century Canadian women artists
Artists from London, Ontario
Canadian watercolourists
Canadian women painters